The Covenant School is a K-12 classical Christian private school in Dallas, Texas. It was founded in 1993.

In 2017 the school appointed Robert Littlejohn as head of school, starting with the 2018–2019 school year.

References

External links 
 Covenant School

Private K-12 schools in Dallas
Educational institutions established in 1993
1993 establishments in Texas
Christian schools in Texas